Daniel Hanley may refer to:
Daniel P. Hanley (born 1955), film editor
Dan Hanley (footballer) (1883–?), Australian rules footballer